(+)-Camphor 6-endo-hydroxylase (P450camr) is an enzyme with systematic name (+)-camphor,reduced putidaredoxin:oxygen oxidoreductase (6-endo-hydroxylating). This enzyme catalyses the following chemical reaction

 (+)-camphor + reduced putidaredoxin + O2  (+)-6-endo-hydroxycamphor + oxidized putidaredoxin + H2O

Camphor 6-endo-hydroxylase is a cytochrome P450 monooxygenase from the bacterium Rhodococcus sp. NCIMB 9784.

References

External links 
 

EC 1.14.15